Vijayam Nammude Senani is a 1979 Indian Malayalam film,  directed by K. G. Rajasekharan and produced by G. P. Balan. The film stars Jose, Jose Prakash, Pattom Sadan and Balan K. Nair in the lead roles. The film has musical score by Shankar–Ganesh.

Cast
Jose
Jose Prakash
Pattom Sadan
Balan K. Nair
Janardanan
K. P. Ummer
Vijayalalitha
Priya

Soundtrack
The music was composed by Shankar–Ganesh and the lyrics were written by Bichu Thirumala.

References

External links
 

1979 films
1970s Malayalam-language films
Films scored by Shankar–Ganesh